Queen Munhwa of the Seonsan Gim clan was the second wife of Seongjong of Goryeo and the mother of Queen Wonjeong. She was the first Goryeo's Daebi even there was King Taejo's daughter who became Daebi too, Sunan Daebi.

She was born in "Seonju" (nowadays is Seonsan-eup, Gumi-si, Gyeongsangbuk-do) as the daughter of Gim Won-sung (김원숭, 金元崇) and Lady Wang (부인 왕씨, 夫人 王氏). After her marriage with King Seongjong, she was formally called as Princess Yeonheung while lived in "Yeonheung Palace" (연흥궁, 延興宮) and Princess Hyeondeok since lived in "Hyeondeok Palace" (현덕궁, 玄德宮). She was said to has been raise and take care of her husband's two nephews (Wang Song and Wang Sun) as their parents were died young. During Hyeonjong's reign, she couldn't became a Taehu (queen mother) and instead became Daebi (grand consort; 대비, 大妃) in 1029 with have the same power like queen mother. Then, various government positions, lands and honours were granted to her families.

Although her death date was unknown, but from the day she became grand consort in 1029, it was presumed that she might be died after that. Her funeral procedure became a precedent for Queen Wonmok and Consort Wonsun since when King Munjong discussed what to do with Wonmok's rite, he prepared a plan based on the example of Gim's. Her official residence, Hyeondeok Palace was then inherited by her only daughter with Seongjong, Queen Wonjeong and used as one of the Goryeo royal palace by King Chungsuk later.

In popular culture
Portrayed by Moon Jung-hee and Kim Min-ji in the 2009 KBS2 TV series Empress Cheonchu.

References

External links
Queen Munhwa on Encykorea .
문화왕후 on Doosan Encyclopedia .

Royal consorts of the Goryeo Dynasty
10th-century Korean people
People from Gumi, North Gyeongsang
Year of birth unknown
Year of death unknown